María Victoria Zuloaga Arcodia (born 14 February 1988) is an Argentine field hockey player. At the 2011 Champions Trophy and 2011 Pan American Games, she competed for the Argentina national field hockey team winning the silver medal in both tournaments. After not being considered by different coaches, she made her return to the national team in  late 2015 and won the 2014–2015 World League.

References

External links
 

1988 births
Living people
Las Leonas players
Argentine female field hockey players
Olympic field hockey players of Argentina
Pan American Games silver medalists for Argentina
Field hockey players at the 2016 Summer Olympics
Pan American Games medalists in field hockey
Field hockey players at the 2011 Pan American Games
Medalists at the 2011 Pan American Games